Havildar Peter Thangaraj (24 December 1935 – 24 November 2008) was an Indian football player and a non-commissioned officer in the Indian Army. Thangaraj played for the Indian national side at the 1956 Melbourne and 1960 Rome Olympics. He was voted Asia's best goalkeeper in 1958. Thangaraj was a recipient of Arjuna Award for the year 1967.

Thangaraj played domestic club football for both the Calcutta Football League clubs Mohun Bagan and East Bengal. He earned fame during his days with the "red and gold brigade" from 1965 to 1971, and captained the team in 1969–70. He was the first choice goalkeeper for the club over the years.

Club career
Thangraj was born in 1935 in Hyderabad State. He started his football career with Morning Star Club and Friends Union Club of Secunderabad. He joined the Indian Army in 1953 and began representing the Madras Regimental Centre where he played as a centre forward, but took to goalkeeping subsequently with great success. Madras Regimental Centre won the Durand Cup in 1955 and 1958. Thangaraj captained the Services team for its first-ever triumph in the Santosh Trophy in 1960.

After leaving Services, Thangaraj played for Kolkata giants Mohammedan Sporting (1960–63, 1971–72), Mohun Bagan (1963–65), and East Bengal (1965–71) and was a huge fan favorite at the time. He was part of the Bengal team, which won the Santosh Trophy in 1963. Later, he led the Railways in 1965 and won the Santosh Trophy for them. Along with the likes of Chuni Goswami and P. K. Banerjee, Thangaraj was one of the mainstays of the Indian team in 1960s and 70s.

International career
Thangaraj had an illustrious international career. His first stint with the Indian team was the Quadrangular Tournament held at Dacca in 1955. Under the coaching of Syed Abdul Rahim, he played for India both at the 1956 and 1960 Olympics, and represented India at 1958 Tokyo, 1962 Jakarta, and 1966 Bangkok Asian Games. India won the Gold Medal at the 1962 Jakarta Asian Games.

He represented India at the Merdeka Cup tournament held at Kuala Lumpur from 1958 to 1966. He also represented India at the 1964 and 1966 Asian Cup held in Israel and Burma respectively. He was named the Best Goalkeeper of Asia in 1958, and awarded the Arjuna Award in 1967.Recognizing his contribution to Indian football, he was awarded the Arjuna Award by the government of India in 1997. He twice played for the Asian All-Star team and was adjudged the Best Goalkeeper in 1967. Thangaraj retired from active football in 1971 and then took to coaching.

Managerial career
After retirement, in 1973, Thangaraj became head coach of the football team of Aligarh Muslim University. He later managed Goa Professional League side Vasco SC until 1975 and Bokaro Steel Plant team from 1976 to 1995. At that time, Vasco won Bordoloi Trophy, KFA Shield and Chakola Gold Trophy in 1973.

Honours

India
Asian Games Gold medal: 1962
AFC Asian Cup runners-up: 1964
Colombo Cup: 1955
Merdeka Tournament runner-up: 1959; third-place: 1966

Madras Regimental Centre
Durand Cup: 1955, 1958

Mohun Bagan
Durand Cup: 1963, 1964, 1965
Calcutta Football League: 1963, 1964, 1965

East Bengal
IFA Shield: 1970

Services
Santosh Trophy: 1960–61

Bengal
Santosh Trophy: 1962–63

Railways
Santosh Trophy: 1964–65

Individual
Arjuna Award: 1967
AFC Asian All Stars: 1967
East Bengal Club Goalkeeper of the Millennium

See also

List of East Bengal Club captains

References

Further reading

External links
 

Indian footballers
1936 births
2008 deaths
Olympic footballers of India
Recipients of the Arjuna Award
Footballers at the 1956 Summer Olympics
Footballers at the 1960 Summer Olympics
India international footballers
Footballers from Hyderabad, India
Mohun Bagan AC players
East Bengal Club players
Mohammedan SC (Kolkata) players
Association football goalkeepers
Asian Games medalists in football
Footballers at the 1958 Asian Games
Footballers at the 1962 Asian Games
Footballers at the 1966 Asian Games
Asian Games gold medalists for India
Medalists at the 1962 Asian Games
1964 AFC Asian Cup players
Calcutta Football League players